The 2012–13 season was the 116th season of competitive football in Scotland. The season began on 28 July 2012, with the start of the Challenge Cup.

Transfer deals

League competitions

Scottish Premier League

Rangers' participation in the SPL was dependant upon the successful transfer of their membership share of the League to the new company that had bought the club, which would be decided by a vote of the SPL clubs. Eight clubs publicly declared that they would oppose the membership transfer, which would mean that they could not play in the SPL. The vote took place on 4 July 2012, and Rangers were refused re-entry to the SPL by a 10-1 majority. Dundee, who had finished second in the 2011–12 Scottish First Division, were invited to replace Rangers.

Scottish First Division

Scottish Second Division

Scottish Third Division

Scottish Premier Under-20 League

Honours

Cup honours

Non-league honours

Senior

Junior
West Region

East Region

North Region

Individual honours

PFA Scotland awards
The PFA Scotland awards took place in Glasgow on 5 May 2013, with the following winners:

SFWA awards

Scottish clubs in Europe

Summary

Celtic
2012–13 UEFA Champions League

Motherwell
2012–13 UEFA Champions League

2012–13 UEFA Europa League

Heart of Midlothian
2012–13 UEFA Europa League

Dundee United
2012–13 UEFA Europa League

St Johnstone
2012–13 UEFA Europa League

Scotland national team

Women's football

League and Cup honours

Individual honours

SWF awards
The SWF awards evening took place at Hampden Park, Glasgow on 23 November 2012 and the winners were as follows:

Scottish Women's Premier League

Scotland women's national team

Glasgow City
2012–13 UEFA Women's Champions League

Deaths
 11 July: Joe McBride, 74, Kilmarnock, Motherwell, Celtic, Hibs, Partick Thistle, Dunfermline, Clyde and Scotland forward.
 11 July: Bobby Nicol, 76, Hibernian and Berwick Rangers wing half.
 4 August: Jimmy Thomson, 75, St Mirren, Dunfermline and Raith Rovers defender; Dunfermline, Alloa, Berwick Rangers and Raith Rovers manager.
 12 August: Jackie Watters, 92, Celtic and Airdrieonians forward
 25 August: Emilio Pacione, 92, Dundee United winger.
 12 September: Jimmy Andrews, 85, Dundee winger.
 15 October: Jim Rollo, 74, Hibs goalkeeper.
 15 October: Trevor Kemp, Berwick Rangers forward.
 19 October: Iain Jamieson, 84, Aberdeen wing half. 
 23 October: Hughie Hay, 80, Aberdeen, Dundee United and Arbroath forward.
 5 November: Jimmy Stephen, 90, Portsmouth defender, won two caps for Scotland.
 7 November: Harry McShane, 92, Blackburn Rovers and Manchester United winger.
 8 November: Bobby Gilfillan, 74, Cowdenbeath, St Johnstone and Raith Rovers forward.
 5 December: Doug Smith, 75, Dundee United defender and director; Scottish Football League president.
 13 December: Ian Black, 88, Aberdeen, Southampton, Fulham and Scotland goalkeeper.
 16 December: Jim Patterson, 84, Queen of the South forward, all-time top goalscorer for club.
 17 December: Charlie Adam, 50, Arbroath, Brechin City, Dundee United, Forfar Athletic, Partick Thistle and St Johnstone midfielder.
 22 December: Wattie Dick, 85, Third Lanark inside forward.
 22 December: George Hazlett, 89, Celtic winger.
 23 December: Doug Stockdale, 86, Raith Rovers, Ayr United and Forfar Athletic forward.
 29 December: Hugh Adam, 87, Rangers director.
 31 December: Willie Benvie, Dunfermline Athletic and Raith Rovers forward.
 3 January: George Falconer, 66, Raith Rovers, Dundee and Montrose forward. 
 18 January: Peter Boyle, 61, Clyde forward, made one appearance for Australia.
 18 January: Sean Fallon, 90, Celtic defender and assistant manager.
 8 February: Ian Lister, 65, Aberdeen, Dunfermline Athletic, Raith Rovers, St Mirren and Berwick Rangers winger.
 19 February: John Downie, 87, Manchester United inside forward.
 2 March: Jimmy Jackson, 81, Notts County forward.
 7 March: Willie McCulloch, 85, Kilmarnock, Airdrie, St Mirren and Morton winger.
 14 March: Harry Thomson, 72, Burnley and Blackpool goalkeeper.
 21 March: Angus Carmichael, 87, Queen's Park defender; played for Great Britain in the 1948 Olympic Games.
 5 April: Tommy McGhee, 66, Clydebank forward.
 19 April: Peter Armit, 87, St Johnstone and Hamilton winger.
 21 April: Jimmy McGill, 87, Queen of the South forward.
 6 May: Ian MacLeod, 53, Motherwell, Falkirk, Raith Rovers and Meadowbank Thistle player.
 8 May: Ernie Winchester, 68, Aberdeen, Hearts and Arbroath forward.
 17 June: Peter Millar, 62, Arbroath, Dunfermline, Motherwell and Dundee midfielder.

Notes and references

 
Seasons in Scottish football